Sand Point may refer to:

Canada
Sand Point, Ontario, a community
Sand Point, Nova Scotia (disambiguation)
Sand Point (Lake Temagami), a beach on Lake Temagami, Ontario
Sandpoint is one of several locations on Babine Lake, British Columbia, comprising Babine Lake Marine Provincial Park

England
Sand Point, Somerset, a peninsula in North Somerset in Great Britain

United States
Sand Point (peninsula), a peninsula in Lake Washington, Seattle
Sand Point, Seattle, a neighborhood near the Sand Point peninsula
Sand Point, Alaska, a community
Sandpoint, Idaho, a city
Sand Point Light, a lighthouse located near Escanaba, Michigan, on Lake Michigan's northern shore
Sand Point, Oklahoma, a census-designated place